Algoa FM is the leading South African commercial radio station serving the Eastern Cape Province and Garden Route, mostly due to the limited number of alternative radio stations in the locality. It started broadcasting on 1 January 1986 as part of the South African Broadcasting Corporation (SABC). It was privatised in October 1996, and has grown into the Eastern Cape’s leading media house. Algoa FM is licensed by the Independent Communications Authority of South Africa, or ICASA.

Footprint

Algoa FM's broadcast footprint stretches from the Wild Coast to the Garden Route and inland through the Karoo hinterland. 
It enjoys a listening audience of over 505 000, according to the Broadcast Research Council of South Africa (BRC). The station also boasts a growing online listenership from the rest of South Africa and around the world.

Corporate
Algoa FM is a subsidiary of Africa Media Entertainment (AME), which was established in 1997, and is listed on the Johannesburg Stock Exchange in the “Media & Entertainment” category. 
In addition to Algoa FM, AME owns OFM, which broadcasts from Bloemfontein to the Free State, the North West Province, the Northern Cape and Southern Gauteng. AME also owns United Stations, a specialist radio sales house, which represents its assets in the National market; MediaHeads 360, a strategic marketing and content producer; Moneyweb.co.za, and the Central Media Group which encompasses OFM, Digital Platforms and Mahareng Publishing.
Algoa FM’s on-air product connects with the lifestyle of adults who enjoy good music and indulge in quality life experiences. The station also provides global, national, regional and local news, as well as sport, local traffic, weather reports and the latest in entertainment news. 
The target is adults aged 25+, who enjoy popular contemporary music and have the resources to regularly treat themselves to quality life experiences. 
Through a transition from being the leading regional radio station to the leading regional media house, Algoa FM incorporates the power of its website, social media management and on-site activations in its media mix. 
In addition to an iconic building and fresh on-air sound, the station has a responsive and mobile friendly website: www.algoafm.co.za. 
Added into the mix of music and interaction with listeners is global, national and local news, as well as gossip, sport, local traffic and weather reports. In 2018, Algoa FM became the first radio station outside of Gauteng to win the coveted Commercial Station of the Year award. 
Algoa FM was one of the first radio stations in South Africa to cater specifically to the needs of small business. The media house has its own in-house copywriting, graphic design, production and recording facilities, in order to provide a multi-channel package in-house. 
Algoa FM has partnered with the Nelson Mandela Bay Business Chamber to provide hands-on support for small and emerging businesses in the metro. 
The media house is headed by Alfie Jay, who was appointed managing director in 2019 and has been a part of Algoa FM since 1990. 
Jay, who was inducted into Radio’s Hall of Fame in 2021  , was one of the team responsible for commercialising the station after it was bought out of the SABC in 1996.

Content
The station’s claim of “all about the music”, leaves a lot to be desired, with very little exposure offered to new artists, but to instead take the ‘comfort blanket’ approach of playing mostly older songs, with presenters not always knowing much about the artists. Some shows tend to have lots of ‘in jokes’, which eludes most of the audience, with some presenters telling embarrassingly unfunny stories about their family, which suggests lack of preparation for the spoken material. 
Most shows on the station tend to follow a tired, 80s style format, with many presenters resembling washed-up versions of the same era. News readers attempt to use high-level English, frequently fluffing their lines, instead of using plain English, which will make content easier to understand. For those with a higher intellect, who wish to venture out of their musical comfort zones, the station will quickly lose its appeal. 

Presenters seem to get a kick out of mocking artistes, but it would only appear to be the ones who are not native to South Africa – the likes of Sam Smith, and their unique sense of dress style, has been the source of recent ridicule, with voice notes and opinions actively encouraged.  In previous years, the disgraced presenter Daron Mann would fill much of his time making fun of the singer Adele’s size, prior to her weight loss.

Daron Mann Debacle
Daron Mann was the presenter of the self-styled broadcast, The Daron Mann Breakfast Show, or DMB for short. As a presenter, Mann showed a provocative approach and unafraid to stir up controversy. In addition to comments made about Adele, another target was Celine Dion, where he suggested that her then terminally-ill husband was pretending to be ill, in order to escape her music. Mann appeared to be untouchable, or so he thought. During an on-air discussion with his sidekick Charlton Tobias, Mann commented on the “horrific” nature of the dairy industry. This led to one of the station’s advertisers submitting a complaint, which resulted in Mann’s suspension. After a tense wait, and despite both fans and animal rights activists raising a petition to reinstate him on the air, it was announced that Mann had been dismissed from Algoa FM.

Daily Radio Reporters
Morning:Wayne,Lee and Charlie D 06:00-9:00
Roshlie Bloem 9:00-12-00
Kaycee Rossow 12:00-15:00

Footprint
Algoa FM reaches through the Eastern Cape and Garden Route, from Mossel Bay to Barkly East and as far north as Colesberg. 
Algoa FM’s on-air audience stretches from the Garden Route through to the Wild Coast, and inland through the Karoo Hinterland.

Broadcast languages
Predominantly English

Broadcast time
24/7

Target audience
Age group 25+, upper income earners with disposable income.
Predominantly heterosexual, family-oriented, with a very cautious “exclusive” approach. 

Total Audience: Average 505 000 past seven days listeners (BRCSA)

References

The Broadcast Research Council of South Africa (BRC)
African Media Entertainment (AME)
The Annual Guide to Radio in South Africa (AdVantage 2012). Media 24. 2012. Archived from the original on 2013-05-23.

Radio stations in South Africa
Port Elizabeth
Mass media in the Eastern Cape